The 1969 Penn State Nittany Lions football team represented Pennsylvania State University in the 1969 NCAA University Division football season.
Despite posting its second consecutive undefeated, untied season, the Nittany Lions did not have a shot at the national championship. President Richard Nixon said that he would consider the winner of the December 6 matchup between the Texas Longhorns and the Arkansas Razorbacks, then ranked at the top of the polls, and the real voters do not seem to have differed. Paterno, at the 1973 commencement, was quoted saying, "I'd like to know how could the president know so little about Watergate in 1973 and so much about college football in 1969?" Then Pennsylvania Governor Raymond P. Shafer got the White House's attention with Penn State's two-season undefeated streak. A White House assistant called Paterno to invite him and the team to the White House to receive a trophy for their accomplishment. Paterno has stated many times that he responded with, "You can tell the president to take that trophy and shove it."

Penn State declined an invitation to play the Texas/Arkansas winner in the Cotton Bowl Classic, instead playing sixth-ranked Missouri in the Orange Bowl. Penn State beat Missouri 10–3, while Texas beat Notre Dame 21–17 and was recognized as the consensus national champion. Penn State was selected co-national champion by FACT and Sagarin, both NCAA-designated major selectors.

Schedule

Game summaries

Pittsburgh

NC State

Personnel

Post season

NFL Draft
Eight Nittany Lions were drafted in the 1970 NFL Draft.

Awards
Mike Reid
Maxwell Award
Outland Trophy

References

Penn State
Penn State Nittany Lions football seasons
Lambert-Meadowlands Trophy seasons
Orange Bowl champion seasons
College football undefeated seasons
Penn State Nittany Lions football